Charles N. Gardner (March 29, 1845 – February 22, 1919) was an American soldier who fought in the American Civil War. Gardner received his country's highest award for bravery during combat, the Medal of Honor. Gardner's medal was won for capturing the flag at the Battle of Five Forks in Virginia on April 1, 1865. He was honored with the award on May 10, 1865.

Gardner joined the 18th Massachusetts Infantry in August 1862, and was transferred to the 32nd Massachusetts Infantry in October 1864. As a result of his MOH action, he was commissioned as a Second Lieutenant, and mustered out with his regiment in June 1865.

Medal of Honor citation

See also
List of American Civil War Medal of Honor recipients: G–L

References

1845 births
1919 deaths
American Civil War recipients of the Medal of Honor
People from Norwell, Massachusetts
Union Army soldiers
United States Army Medal of Honor recipients
People of Massachusetts in the American Civil War